Filmed in Supermarionation is a 2014 documentary film about Gerry Anderson, Sylvia Anderson and the struggling group of filmmakers who found success producing space-age puppet television series such as Supercar, Joe 90, Fireball XL5, Captain Scarlet and the Mysterons and Thunderbirds. Directed by Stephen La Rivière, and based on his book of the same name, the film was favorably received by critics. It was released theatrically in the UK on 11 October 2014, having been premiered at the British Film Institute on 30 September 2014. It was subsequently released on DVD and Blu-ray.

Synopsis
Filmed in Supermarionation tells the story of the development of Supermarionation, a term coined to describe the unique form of puppetry employed by the teams at AP Films and Century 21 studios under the watchful eyes of Gerry and Sylvia Anderson. The documentary is hosted by Lady Penelope and Parker, the puppet stars of Thunderbirds, who seek to uncover the story behind their creation.

Production
Filmed in Supermarionation is notable for the filmmakers' efforts to create new puppet and special effects sequences that match the look and feel of the programmes produced by AP films during the 1960s. Dialogue was recorded with members of the original Thunderbirds voice cast and puppets and sets were recreated to as close to the specification of the original Supermarionation series as possible. In addition to attempting to recreate 1960s film-making techniques, 21st century methods were also employed in the interest of matching the original productions. Although special effects sequences were shot on 35mm film stock, puppet sequences were captured digitally. This allowed for the image to be manipulated in post production to better match the unique qualities of 1960s film photography. The digital workflow also allowed for wire removal and digital set extensions to be utilised.

Apparently, Century 21 stills photographer Doug Luke was interviewed for the documentary, but is neither on it nor the deleted scenes.

Reception

Upon release, Filmed in Supermarionation was generally well received by critics writing across a wide range of publications. Peter Bradshaw of The Guardian gave the film four stars, writing that, "There is something very romantic about this success story of British entrepreneurial creativity."  Rich Trenholm of CNET was similarly positive in stating, "the documentary's vibrant storytelling captures the vitality, innocence and sense of joy of the series themselves".

Martin Townsend, in his New Year's editorial for The Sunday Express, enthused, "The likes of Apple and Microsoft may be very impressive companies, but if I wanted to inspire children to be creative entrepreneurs I'd show them the Supermarionation film."

References

External links
 
 

2014 films
Documentary films about the film industry
Documentary films about television
2014 documentary films
British documentary films
AP Films
Documentary films about animation
2010s English-language films
2010s British films